The 2018–19 Detroit Pistons season was the 78th season of the franchise, the 71st in the National Basketball Association (NBA), and the second in Midtown Detroit. This was the first season under new head coach Dwane Casey. 

The Pistons qualified for the NBA playoffs during the final game of the regular season with a 115–89 victory over the New York Knicks on April 10. This marked the first time the team qualified for the playoffs since the 2015–16 season and for only the second time in the last 10 seasons. In the first round of the playoffs, the Pistons were eliminated by the Milwaukee Bucks in four games, and got swept in the playoffs for the third time since 2009, not winning a playoff game since May 26, 2008.

As of 2022, This season marked the last time the Pistons made the playoffs.

Offseason
On May 7, 2018, the Detroit Pistons fired head coach Stan Van Gundy after the team missed the playoffs for the second consecutive season. On June 11, 2018, the Pistons hired Dwane Casey as head coach.

Draft picks

Roster
  

 

<noinclude>

Standings

Division

Conference

Game log

Preseason

|- style="background:#bfb;"
| 1
| October 3
| @ Oklahoma City
| W 97–91 
| Andre Drummond (31)
| Andre Drummond (16)
| Ish Smith (5)
| Chesapeake Energy Arena18,203
| 1–0
|- style="background:#fcc;"
| 2
| October 5
| @ San Antonio
| L 93–117 
| Andre Drummond (18)
| Andre Drummond (10)
| Ish Smith (6)
| AT&T Center18,121
| 1–1
|- style="background:#fcc;"
| 3
| October 8
| Brooklyn
| L 108–110 (OT) 
| Langston Galloway (24)
| Andre Drummond (10)
| Ish Smith (10)
| Little Caesars Arena7,691
| 1–2
|- style="background:#fcc;"
| 4
| October 10
| Washington
| L 97–102 
| Andre Drummond (17)
| Andre Drummond (20)
| Blake Griffin (4)
| Little Caesars Arena9,117
| 1–3
|- style="background:#bfb;"
| 5
| October 12
| @ Cleveland
| W 129–110 
| Blake Griffin (29)
| Andre Drummond (15)
| Griffin, Jackson (5)
| Breslin Student Events Center7,517
| 2–3

Regular season

|- bgcolor=ccffcc
| 1
| October 17
| Brooklyn
| 
| Blake Griffin (26)
| Andre Drummond (20)
| Blake Griffin (6)
| Little Caesars Arena20,332
| 1–0
|- bgcolor=ccffcc
| 2
| October 20
| @ Chicago
| 
| Blake Griffin (33)
| Andre Drummond (13)
| Reggie Jackson (6)
| United Center21,289
| 2–0
|- bgcolor=ccffcc
| 3
| October 23
| Philadelphia
| 
| Blake Griffin (50)
| Andre Drummond (16)
| Blake Griffin (6)
| Little Caesars Arena14,418
| 3–0
|- bgcolor=ccffcc
| 4
| October 25
| Cleveland
| 
| Drummond & Griffin (26)
| Andre Drummond (22)
| Reggie Bullock (6)
| Little Caesars Arena15,896
| 4–0
|- bgcolor=ffcccc
| 5
| October 27
| Boston
| 
| Andre Drummond (18)
| Andre Drummond (8)
| Reggie Jackson (4)
| Little Caesars Arena18,120
| 4–1
|- bgcolor=ffcccc
| 6
| October 30
| @ Boston
| 
| Blake Griffin (24)
| Blake Griffin (15)
| Stanley Johnson (4)
| TD Garden18,624
| 4–2
|- bgcolor=ffcccc
| 7
| October 31
| @ Brooklyn
| 
| Blake Griffin (25)
| Andre Drummond (23)
| Griffin & Smith (4)
| Barclays Center12,862
| 4–3

|- bgcolor=ffcccc
| 8
| November 3
| @ Philadelphia
| 
| Blake Griffin (38)
| Blake Griffin (13)
| Blake Griffin (6)
| Wells Fargo Center20,289
| 4–4
|- bgcolor=ffcccc
| 9
| November 5
| Miami
| 
| Drummond & Jackson (25)
| Andre Drummond (21)
| Blake Griffin (7)
| Little Caesars Arena14,148
| 4–5
|- bgcolor=ccffcc
| 10
| November 7
| @ Orlando
| 
| Andre Drummond (23)
| Andre Drummond (19)
| Jackson & Smith (4)
| Amway Center16,103
| 5–5
|- bgcolor=ccffcc
| 11
| November 9
| @ Atlanta
| 
| Andre Drummond (23)
| Andre Drummond (11)
| Blake Griffin (9)
| State Farm Arena14,759
| 6–5
|- bgcolor=ffcccc
| 12
| November 11
| Charlotte
| 
| Bullock & Drummond (23)
| Andre Drummond (22)
| Reggie Jackson (7)
| Little Caesars Arena15,133
| 6–6
|- bgcolor=ccffcc
| 13
| November 14
| @ Toronto
| 
| Blake Griffin (30)
| Andre Drummond (14)
| Reggie Jackson (6)
| Scotiabank Arena19,800
| 7–6
|- bgcolor=ccffcc
| 14
| November 19
| Cleveland
| 
| Andre Drummond (23)
| Andre Drummond (16)
| Blake Griffin (5)
| Little Caesars Arena15,769
| 8–6
|- bgcolor=ffcccc
| 15
| November 21
| @ Houston
| 
| Blake Griffin (37)
| Drummond & Griffin (11)
| Reggie Bullock (6)
| Toyota Center18,055
| 8–7
|- bgcolor=ccffcc
| 16
| November 23
| Houston
| 
| Blake Griffin (28)
| Andre Drummond (20)
| Reggie Jackson (6)
| Little Caesars Arena17,268
| 9–7
|- bgcolor=ccffcc
| 17
| November 25
| Phoenix
| 
| Drummond & Jackson (19)
| Andre Drummond (16)
| Blake Griffin (11)
| Little Caesars Arena14,413
| 10–7
|- bgcolor=ccffcc
| 18
| November 27
| New York
| 
| Blake Griffin (30)
| Andre Drummond (14)
| Ish Smith (7)
| Little Caesars Arena13,935
| 11–7
|- bgcolor=ccffcc
| 19
| November 30
| Chicago
| 
| Griffin & Jackson (20)
| Andre Drummond (19)
| Reggie Bullock (6)
| Little Caesars Arena15,372
| 12–7

|- bgcolor=ccffcc
| 20
| December 1
| Golden State
| 
| Blake Griffin (26)
| Andre Drummond (19)
| Griffin & Jackson (5)
| Little Caesars Arena20,332
| 13–7
|- bgcolor=ffcccc
| 21
| December 3
| Oklahoma City
| 
| Blake Griffin (20)
| Drummond, Pachulia & Robinson III (6)
| Blake Griffin (4)
| Little Caesars Arena14,372
| 13–8
|- bgcolor=ffcccc
| 22
| December 5
| @ Milwaukee
| 
| Blake Griffin (31)
| Stanley Johnson (9)
| Reggie Jackson (6)
| Fiserv Forum16,541
| 13–9
|- bgcolor=ffcccc
| 23
| December 7
| Philadelphia
| 
| Blake Griffin (31)
| Blake Griffin (12)
| Blake Griffin (6)
| Little Caesars Arena15,680
| 13–10
|- bgcolor=ffcccc
| 24
| December 9
| New Orleans
| 
| Blake Griffin (35)
| Andre Drummond (19)
| José Calderón (9)
| Little Caesars Arena14,705
| 13–11
|- bgcolor=ffcccc
| 25
| December 10
| @ Philadelphia
| 
| Luke Kennard (28)
| Andre Drummond (17)
| Reggie Jackson (7)
| Wells Fargo Center20,199
| 13–12
|- bgcolor=ffcccc
| 26
| December 12
| @ Charlotte
| 
| Blake Griffin (26)
| Andre Drummond (13)
| Blake Griffin (7)
| Spectrum Center13,997
| 13–13
|- bgcolor=ccffcc
| 27
| December 15
| Boston
| 
| Blake Griffin (27)
| Andre Drummond (20)
| José Calderón (8)
| Little Caesars Arena14,500
| 14–13
|- bgcolor=ffcccc
| 28
| December 17
| Milwaukee
| 
| Reggie Bullock (24)
| Andre Drummond (14)
| Blake Griffin (11)
| Little Caesars Arena15,051
| 14–14
|- bgcolor=ccffcc
| 29
| December 19
| @ Minnesota
| 
| Blake Griffin (34)
| Andre Drummond (16)
| José Calderón (7)
| Target Center15,883
| 15–14
|- bgcolor=ffcccc
| 30
| December 21
| @ Charlotte
| 
| Blake Griffin (23)
| Andre Drummond (16)
| Blake Griffin (5)
| Spectrum Center15,812
| 15–15
|- bgcolor=ffcccc
| 31
| December 23
| Atlanta
| 
| Langston Galloway (18)
| Andre Drummond (15)
| Reggie Jackson (5)
| Little Caesars Arena15,532
| 15–16
|- bgcolor=ccffcc
| 32
| December 26
| Washington
| 
| Blake Griffin (23)
| Andre Drummond (11)
| Griffin & Jackson (6)
| Little Caesars Arena17,534
| 16–16
|- bgcolor=ffcccc
| 33
| December 28
| @ Indiana
| 
| Blake Griffin (18)
| Andre Drummond (12)
| José Calderón (7)
| Bankers Life Fieldhouse17,923
| 16–17
|- bgcolor=ffcccc
| 34
| December 30
| @ Orlando
| 
| Bullock & Griffin (15)
| Andre Drummond (15)
| Blake Griffin (5)
| Amway Center17,761
| 16–18

|- bgcolor=ffcccc
| 35
| January 1
| @ Milwaukee
| 
| Blake Griffin (29)
| Griffin & Leuer (9)
| Blake Griffin (4)
| Fiserv Forum17,534
| 16–19
|- bgcolor=ccffcc
| 36
| January 2
| @ Memphis
| 
| Blake Griffin (26)
| Andre Drummond (10)
| Blake Griffin (7)
| FedExForum14,109
| 17–19
|- bgcolor=ffcccc
| 37
| January 5
| Utah
| 
| Blake Griffin (34)
| Andre Drummond (18)
| Bruce Brown Jr. (7)
| Little Caesars Arena17,255
| 17–20
|- bgcolor=ffcccc
| 38
| January 7
| San Antonio
| 
| Blake Griffin (34)
| Andre Drummond (14)
| Blake Griffin (8)
| Little Caesars Arena13,107
| 17–21
|- bgcolor=ffcccc
| 39
| January 9
| @ LA Lakers
| 
| Blake Griffin (16)
| Andre Drummond (17)
| Blake Griffin (6)
| Staples Center18,997
| 17–22
|- bgcolor=ffcccc
| 40
| January 10
| @ Sacramento
| 
| Stanley Johnson (16)
| Andre Drummond (11)
| Bullock & Calderón (6)
| Golden 1 Center16,916
| 17–23
|- bgcolor=ccffcc
| 41
| January 12
| @ LA Clippers
| 
| Blake Griffin (44)
| Andre Drummond (21)
| Blake Griffin (5)
| Staples Center16,540
| 18–23
|- bgcolor=ffcccc
| 42
| January 14
| @ Utah
| 
| Blake Griffin (19)
| Andre Drummond (13)
| Griffin & Jackson (4)
| Vivint Smart Home Arena18,306
| 18–24
|- bgcolor=ccffcc
| 43
| January 16
| Orlando
| 
| Blake Griffin (30)
| Andre Drummond (22)
| Reggie Bullock (6)
| Little Caesars Arena14,019
| 19–24
|- bgcolor=ccffcc
| 44
| January 18
| Miami
| 
| Blake Griffin (32)
| Blake Griffin (11)
| Blake Griffin (9)
| Little Caesars Arena17,228
| 20–24
|- bgcolor=ffcccc
| 45
| January 19
| Sacramento
| 
| Blake Griffin (38)
| Zaza Pachulia (12)
| Brown & Calderón (4)
| Little Caesars Arena15,377
| 20–25
|- bgcolor=ffcccc
| 46
| January 21
| @ Washington
| 
| Blake Griffin (29)
| Blake Griffin (9)
| Brown, Bullock, Calderón & Griffin (4)
| Capital One Arena16,229
| 20–26
|- bgcolor=ccffcc
| 47
| January 23
| @ New Orleans
| 
| Blake Griffin (37)
| Zaza Pachulia (10)
| Blake Griffin (7)
| Smoothie King Center18,181
| 21–26
|- bgcolor=ffcccc
| 48
| January 25
| @ Dallas
| 
| Blake Griffin (35)
| Andre Drummond (15)
| Reggies Jackson (9)
| American Airlines Center20,327
| 21–27
|- bgcolor=ffcccc
| 49
| January 29
| Milwaukee
| 
| Reggie Jackson (25)
| Andre Drummond (13)
| Blake Griffin (9)
| Little Caesars Arena14,187
| 21–28
|- bgcolor=ccffcc
| 50
| January 31
| Dallas
| 
| Drummond & Griffin (24)
| Andre Drummond (20)
| Reggie Jackson (9)
| Little Caesars Arena14,075
| 22–28

|- bgcolor=ffcccc
| 51
| February 2
| LA Clippers
| 
| Reggie Jackson (29)
| Drummond & Griffin (11)
| Reggie Jackson (7)
| Little Caesars Arena17,862
| 22–29
|- bgcolor=ccffcc
| 52
| February 4
| Denver
| 
| Andre Drummond (27)
| Andre Drummond (12)
| Ish Smith (5)
| Little Caesars Arena12,589
| 23–29
|- bgcolor=ccffcc
| 53
| February 5
| @ New York
| 
| Blake Griffin (29)
| Andre Drummond (16)
| Blake Griffin (8)
| Madison Square Garden17,853
| 24–29
|- bgcolor=ccffcc
| 54
| February 8
| New York
| 
| Andre Drummond (29)
| Andre Drummond (20)
| Reggie Jackson (6)
| Little Caesars Arena14,430
| 25–29
|- bgcolor=ccffcc
| 55
| February 11
| Washington
| 
| Andre Drummond (32)
| Andre Drummond (17)
| Blake Griffin (9)
| Little Caesars Arena15,246
| 26–29
|- bgcolor=ffcccc
| 56
| February 13
| @ Boston
| 
| Blake Griffin (32)
| Andre Drummond (17)
| Griffin & Kennard (5)
| TD Garden18,624
| 26–30
|- align="center"
|colspan="9" bgcolor="#bbcaff"|All-Star Break
|- bgcolor=ccffcc
| 57
| February 22
| @ Atlanta
| 
| Reggie Jackson (32)
| Andre Drummond (21)
| Reggie Jackson (8)
| State Farm Arena14,067
| 27–30
|- bgcolor=ccffcc
| 58
| February 23
| @ Miami
| 
| Ish Smith (22)
| Andre Drummond (14)
| Ish Smith (9)
| American Airlines Arena19,600
| 28–30
|- bgcolor=ccffcc
| 59
| February 25
| Indiana
| 
| Andre Drummond (26)
| Andre Drummond (16)
| Blake Griffin (10)
| Little Caesars Arena15,321
| 29–30
|- bgcolor=ffcccc
| 60
| February 27
| @ San Antonio
| 
| Reggie Jackson (22)
| Andre Drummond (17)
| Blake Griffin (7)
| AT&T Center18,354
| 29–31

|- bgcolor=ccffcc
| 61
| March 2
| @ Cleveland
| 
| Luke Kennard (26)
| Andre Drummond (10)
| Blake Griffin (9)
| Quicken Loans Arena19,432
| 30–31
|- bgcolor=ccffcc
| 62
| March 3
| Toronto
| 
| Blake Griffin (27)
| Andre Drummond (17)
| Ish Smith (8)
| Little Caesars Arena19,161
| 31–31
|- bgcolor=ccffcc
| 63
| March 6
| Minnesota
| 
| Andre Drummond (31)
| Andre Drummond (15)
| Blake Griffin (7)
| Little Caesars Arena15,240
| 32–31
|- bgcolor=ccffcc
| 64
| March 8
| @ Chicago
| 
| Blake Griffin (27)
| Andre Drummond (24)
| Ish Smith (7)
| United Center21,048
| 33–31
|- bgcolor=ccffcc
| 65
| March 10
| Chicago
| 
| Blake Griffin (28)
| Andre Drummond (15)
| Reggie Jackson (6)
| Little Caesars Arena19,356
| 34–31
|- bgcolor=ffcccc
| 66
| March 11
| @ Brooklyn
| 
| Andre Drummond (13)
| Andre Drummond (20)
| Blake Griffin (6)
| Barclays Center17,732
| 34–32
|- bgcolor=ffcccc
| 67
| March 13
| @ Miami
| 
| Blake Griffin (13)
| Andre Drummond (9)
| Luke Kennard (4)
| American Airlines Arena19,600
| 34–33
|- bgcolor=ccffcc
| 68
| March 15
| LA Lakers
| 
| Reggie Jackson (20)
| Andre Drummond (23)
| Blake Griffin (9)
| Little Caesars Arena20,768
| 35–33
|- bgcolor=ccffcc
| 69
| March 17
| Toronto
|  
| Blake Griffin (25)
| Andre Drummond (17)
| Ish Smith (8)
| Little Caesars Arena19,277
| 36–33
|- bgcolor=ffcccc
| 70
| March 18
| @ Cleveland
| 
| Wayne Ellington (25)
| Andre Drummond (21)
| Drummond & Smith (5)
| Quicken Loans Arena18,465
| 36–34
|- bgcolor=ccffcc
| 71
| March 21
| @ Phoenix
| 
| Wayne Ellington (23)
| Andre Drummond (19)
| Blake Griffin (8)
| Talking Stick Resort Arena16,066
| 37–34
|- bgcolor=ffcccc
| 72
| March 23
| @ Portland
| 
| Blake Griffin (27)
| Andre Drummond (11)
| Blake Griffin (6)
| Moda Center19,815
| 37–35
|- bgcolor=ffcccc
| 73
| March 24
| @ Golden State
| 
| Blake Griffin (24)
| Andre Drummond (11)
| Blake Griffin (8)
| Oracle Arena19,596
| 37–36
|- bgcolor=ffcccc
| 74
| March 26
| @ Denver
| 
| Blake Griffin (29)
| Andre Drummond (18)
| Griffin & Jackson (5)
| Pepsi Center19,520
| 37–37
|- bgcolor=ccffcc
| 75
| March 28
| Orlando
| 
| Wayne Ellington (25)
| Andre Drummond (17)
| Ish Smith (7)
| Little Caesars Arena18,128
| 38–37
|- bgcolor=ccffcc
| 76
| March 30
| Portland
| 
| Reggie Jackson (28)
| Andre Drummond (19)
| Reggie Jackson (5)
| Little Caesars Arena18,592
| 39–37

|- bgcolor=ffcccc
| 77
| April 1
| @ Indiana
| 
| Wayne Ellington (26)
| Andre Drummond (17)
| Andre Drummond (5)
| Bankers Life Fieldhouse15,760
| 39–38
|- bgcolor=ffcccc
| 78
| April 3
| Indiana
| 
| Andre Drummond (28)
| Andre Drummond (19)
| Ish Smith (7)
| Little Caesars Arena18,984
| 39–39
|- bgcolor=ffcccc
| 79
| April 5
| @ Oklahoma City
| 
| Blake Griffin (45)
| Andre Drummond (9)
| Ish Smith (4)
| Chesapeake Energy Arena18,203
| 39–40
|- bgcolor=ffcccc
| 80
| April 7
| Charlotte
| 
| Ish Smith (20)
| Andre Drummond (23)
| Griffin & Smith (4)
| Little Caesars Arena19,871
| 39–41
|- bgcolor=ccffcc
| 81
| April 9
| Memphis
| 
| Ish Smith (22)
| Andre Drummond (17)
| Reggie Jackson (5)
| Little Caesars Arena19,802
| 40–41
|- bgcolor=ccffcc
| 82
| April 10
| @ New York
| 
| Luke Kennard (27)
| Andre Drummond (18)
| Reggie Jackson (7)
| Madison Square Garden19,812
| 41–41

Playoffs

Game log

|- bgcolor=ffcccc
| 1
| April 14
| @ Milwaukee
| 
| Luke Kennard (21)
| Andre Drummond (12)
| Ish Smith (6)
| Fiserv Forum17,529
| 0–1
|- bgcolor=ffcccc
| 2
| April 17
| @ Milwaukee
| 
| Luke Kennard (19)
| Andre Drummond (16)
| Reggie Jackson (8)
| Fiserv Forum17,513
| 0–2
|- bgcolor=ffcccc
| 3
| April 20
| Milwaukee
| 
| Blake Griffin (27)
| Andre Drummond (12)
| Reggie Jackson (8)
| Little Caesars Arena20,520
| 0–3
|- bgcolor=ffcccc
| 4
| April 22
| Milwaukee
| 
| Reggie Jackson (26)
| Andre Drummond (12)
| Reggie Jackson (7)
| Little Caesars Arena20,332
| 0–4

Player statistics

Regular season

|-
| align="left"| || align="center"| SG
| 74 || 56 || 1,449 || 185 || 91 || 40 || 36 || 319
|-
| align="left"|† || align="center"| SG
| 44 || 44 || 1,355 || 123 || 109 || 24 || 5 || 534
|-
| align="left"| || align="center"| PG
| 49 || 0 || 632 || 60 || 115 || 16 || 3 || 113
|-
| align="left"| || align="center"| C
| 79 || 79 || style=";"|2,647 || style=";"|1,232 || 112 || style=";"|136 || style=";"|138 || 1,370
|-
| align="left"|‡ || align="center"| PF
| 2 || 0 || 25 || 9 || 1 || 0 || 0 || 12
|-
| align="left"|≠ || align="center"| SG
| 28 || 26 || 764 || 60 || 43 || 30 || 3 || 336
|-
| align="left"| || align="center"| SG
| 80 || 4 || 1,745 || 171 || 85 || 37 || 8 || 672
|-
| align="left"| || align="center"| PF
| 75 || 75 || 2,622 || 565 || style=";"|402 || 52 || 28 || style=";"|1,841
|-
| align="left"| || align="center"| PG
| style=";"|82 || style=";"|82 || 2,289 || 216 || 344 || 55 || 9 || 1,260
|-
| align="left"|† || align="center"| SF
| 48 || 7 || 961 || 175 || 60 || 48 || 13 || 358
|-
| align="left"| || align="center"| SG
| 63 || 10 || 1,437 || 183 || 114 || 26 || 10 || 613
|-
| align="left"| || align="center"| PF
| 41 || 1 || 402 || 97 || 14 || 12 || 4 || 156
|-
| align="left"|‡ || align="center"| SG
| 1 || 0 || 4 || 0 || 0 || 1 || 0 || 0
|-
| align="left"|≠ || align="center"| PG
| 1 || 0 || 6 || 3 || 1 || 0 || 0 || 2
|-
| align="left"|≠ || align="center"| PF
| 29 || 5 || 563 || 106 || 27 || 11 || 33 || 159
|-
| align="left"|≠ || align="center"| SF
| 3 || 0 || 20 || 2 || 4 || 1 || 0 || 6
|-
| align="left"| || align="center"| C
| 68 || 3 || 878 || 265 || 91 || 31 || 17 || 267
|-
| align="left"| || align="center"| SF
| 47 || 18 || 610 || 71 || 21 || 14 || 8 || 198
|-
| align="left"| || align="center"| PG
| 56 || 0 || 1,251 || 145 || 203 || 28 || 11 || 501
|-
| align="left"| || align="center"| SG
| 26 || 0 || 195 || 20 || 8 || 7 || 5 || 61
|}
After all games.
‡Waived during the season
†Traded during the season
≠Acquired during the season

Playoffs

|-
| align="left"| || align="center"| SG
| style=";"|4 || 2 || 57 || 8 || 2 || 2 || 1 || 13
|-
| align="left"| || align="center"| PG
| 3 || 0 || 10 || 0 || 5 || 1 || 0 || 0
|-
| align="left"| || align="center"| C
| style=";"|4 || style=";"|4 || 127 || style=";"|52 || 9 || style=";"|6 || style=";"|5 || 57
|-
| align="left"| || align="center"| SG
| style=";"|4 || style=";"|4 || 131 || 15 || 5 || 3 || 0 || 31
|-
| align="left"| || align="center"| SG
| style=";"|4 || 0 || 110 || 15 || 4 || 2 || 4 || 31
|-
| align="left"| || align="center"| PF
| 2 || 2 || 58 || 12 || 12 || 2 || 0 || 49
|-
| align="left"| || align="center"| PG
| style=";"|4 || style=";"|4 || 108 || 13 || style=";"|28 || 3 || 0 || style=";"|71
|-
| align="left"| || align="center"| SG
| style=";"|4 || 2 || style=";"|133 || 16 || 7 || 3 || 1 || 60
|-
| align="left"| || align="center"| PF
| 1 || 0 || 5 || 0 || 0 || 0 || 0 || 2
|-
| align="left"| || align="center"| PF
| style=";"|4 || 2 || 69 || 9 || 4 || 0 || 4 || 22
|-
| align="left"| || align="center"| C
| 2 || 0 || 22 || 9 || 0 || 0 || 0 || 5
|-
| align="left"| || align="center"| SF
| 3 || 0 || 36 || 7 || 2 || 2 || 0 || 13
|-
| align="left"| || align="center"| PG
| style=";"|4 || 0 || 81 || 11 || 14 || 3 || 1 || 24
|-
| align="left"| || align="center"| SG
| 3 || 0 || 15 || 2 || 0 || 2 || 0 || 14
|}

Transactions

Overview

Trades

Free agency

Additions

Subtractions

Awards

References

Detroit Pistons seasons
Detroit Pistons
Detroit Pistons
Detroit Pistons